Becki is a feminine given name. It is a pet form of Rebecca. Becki may refer to:

 Becki Newton, American actress
 Becki Pipette, English singer

References

See also

 Becky (disambiguation)
 Beki
 Litoria becki

Feminine given names
English feminine given names